Ethylene thiourea (ETU) is an organosulfur compound with the formula . It is an example of an N,N-disubstituted thiourea.  It is a white solid.  It is synthesized by treating ethylenediamine with carbon disulfide.

Ethylene thioureas are an excellent accelerant of vulcanization of neoprene rubbers.  In commercial use is the N,N'-diphenylethylenethiourea. Due to reproductive toxicity, carcinogenicity, and mutagenicity, alternatives are being sought to the ethylenethioureas.  One candidate replacement is N-methyl-2-thiazolidinethione.

Ethylene thiourea can be used as a biomarker of exposure to ethylenebisdithiocarbamates (EBDTCs), which are frequently employed as fungicides in agriculture, mainly on fruits, vegetables and ornamental plants.

EPA classification 
EPA (United States Environmental Protection Agency) has classified ethylene thiourea as a Group B2, probable human carcinogen. Ethylene thiourea has been shown to be a potent teratogen (causes birth defects) in rats orally or dermally exposed.

See also
Mercaptobenzothiazole - a cyclic dithiocarbamate also used as a vulcanization accelerant

References

Thioureas